Parli Pro is a shortened name for the National FFA Organization Parliamentary Procedure Career Development Event.

The FFA Parliamentary Procedure Contest is based on a two-part demonstration of parliamentary procedure knowledge, a knowledge test, and an 8 to 10 minute, depending on the state, demonstration of parliamentary law. Six students form a team who demonstrates a local FFA Chapter meeting. A single motion is handled as in a real meeting. Each team member is given a specific topic or motion in which he and she is to perform (i.e. to refer a matter to a committee, postpone definitely, extend limits or debate, appeal, etc.). Contestants are judged on public speaking skills, debate, proper use of parliamentary procedure, and parliamentary procedure knowledge. The president, or chairman, is judged on the ability to preside, etc.

The contest, like other FFA Career Development Events, are held at the sectional, regional, state, and national levels. Most parli pro contests are based on an elimination system, in which teams perform in rounds, where the best 4 - 6 teams are moved on to the next round. At the state and national levels, the top teams can be separated by mere points (out of 1000 total contest points).

The Oregon Association utilizes a different organization of their Parli Pro CDE.  It lacks a written test and question-and-answer period that is present at the National level.  All of the teams compete at the same time, with three teams on the floor at a time and one team chairing each "session" of the contest.  Additional teams are rotated in after each session.  It is run as a mock version of the first delegate session at the State Convention.  Debate topics are drawn at random from a list of 20 topics that pertain to current agricultural issues and FFA-related issues.  Points are given based on motions moved and the quality of a student's debate.  The chairman's abilities are also scored, as are the Secretary's minutes that are taken during the session that the team is chairing.

Parli Pro is one of many Leadership Development Events (LDEs) held each year, including Extemporaneous Public Speaking, Prepared Public Speaking, Creed Contest, Sectional Opening, and Closing, and Job Interview.

National Winners 
Each State Association names a State Winner and that team is therefore eligible to compete in the National Contest.

Current Winners 
As of October 29th, 2022 the current winners of the National FFA Parliamentary Procedure Leadership Development Event are:

First Place: Lafayette  FFA (Florida) 

Second Place: Gilmer County FFA (West Virginia)

Third Place: Troy FFA (Missouri)

Fourth Place: Winfield FFA (Louisiana)

Past winners
1992- Ritzville (Washington)
 
1993- Troy (Missouri)
 
1994- Carthage (Missouri)
 
1995- Carthage (Missouri)
 
1996- Carthage (Missouri) 
 
1997- Ritzville (Washington)
 
1998- Bear River (California)
 
1999- Troy (Missouri)
 
2000- Cheyenne (Wyoming)
 
2001- Sierra (California)
 
2002- Bear River (California) 
 
2003- Bear River (California)
 
2004- Cheyenne (Wyoming)
 
2005- Moriarty (New Mexico)
 
2006- Stockton (Missouri)
 
2007- Foot Hill (California)
 
2008- Millennium (Arizona)
 
2009- Sullivan (Illinois) 
 
2010- Eldon (Missouri)
 
2011- Nevada Union (California)
 
2012- Minarets (California)
 
2013- Kingfisher (Oklahoma)
 
2014- Eldon (Missouri) 
 
2015- San Luis Obispo (California) 
 
2016- O’ Neals Minrets (California)
 
2017- Liberty Ranch (California) 
 
2018- Lake Butler (Florida)
 
2019 - Imperial (Nebraska) 
 
2020- No Winner Due to the COVID-19 Pandemic

2021- Galt Liberty Ranch (California)

See also 
 Robert's Rules of Order

References 

Parliamentary procedure